Ridgewood Heights, (referred to  as Ridgewood locally) is an unincorporated community in Humboldt County, California. This neighborhood is part of unincorporated Eureka, California, located entirely within the 95503 zip code.

References

External links
 http://www.ridgewoodheights.org/

Eureka, California
Unincorporated communities in California